The 2022 Poznań Open was a professional tennis tournament played on clay courts. It was the 18th edition of the tournament which was part of the 2022 ATP Challenger Tour. It took place at the Park Tenisowy Olimpia in Poznań, Poland from 30 May to 5 June 2022.

Singles main-draw entrants

Seeds

 1 Rankings are as of 23 May 2022.

Other entrants
The following players received wildcards into the singles main draw:
  Leo Borg
  Jerzy Janowicz
  Aldin Šetkić

The following player received entry into the singles main draw using a protected ranking:
  Attila Balázs

The following players received entry into the singles main draw as alternates:
  Gonzalo Lama
  Genaro Alberto Olivieri

The following players received entry from the qualifying draw:
  Daniel Dutra da Silva
  Elmar Ejupovic
  Maks Kaśnikowski
  Georgii Kravchenko
  Oleksii Krutykh
  Daniel Michalski

Champions

Singles

  Arthur Rinderknech def.  Tomás Barrios Vera 6–3, 7–6(7–2).

Doubles

  Hunter Reese /  Szymon Walków def.  Marek Gengel /  Adam Pavlásek 1–6, 6–3, [10–6].

References

2022 ATP Challenger Tour
2022
2022 in Polish tennis
May 2022 sports events in Europe
June 2022 sports events in Europe